The 2008 Czech Republic motorcycle Grand Prix was the twelfth round of the 2008 MotoGP Championship. It took place on the weekend of 15–17 August 2008 at the Masaryk Circuit located in Brno.

MotoGP classification

250 cc classification

125 cc classification

Championship standings after the race (MotoGP)

Below are the standings for the top five riders and constructors after round twelve has concluded. 

Riders' Championship standings

Constructors' Championship standings

 Note: Only the top five positions are included for both sets of standings.

References

Czech Republic motorcycle Grand Prix
Czech Republic
Motorcycle Grand Prix